A double referendum was held in Poland on 18 February 1996. One concerned enfranchisement, whilst the others concerned state property. The first was ordered by the President, whilst the others were created on the basis of resolution made by Sejm. All except one were approved by over 90% of voters. However, voter turnout was just 32%, well below the 50% threshold required to make the referendums valid.

Act about the referendums
The act about the referendums was passed on June 25, 1995 (Dz.U. 99, position 487 from 25.08.1995)

Subject of the referendums

Enfranchisement referendum
On 29 November 1995, President of Poland Lech Wałęsa, after getting permission from Senate, mandated the referendum with the question:
Do you approve the enfranchisement of citizens?

Privatisation referendum
On 21 December 1995 the Sejm passed a referendums act, in which four question were to be placed on the ballot:
Are you for or against – obligations towards pensioners, annuitants and retirees in the Civil Service will be fulfilled with the privatised state-owned assets?
Are you for or against – a part of the privatised state-owned assets will be assigned to public pension funds?
Are you for or against – the value of joint stock certificates in National Investment Fund will be increased?
Are you for the use of privatisation bonds in the universal property restitution program?

Results

Enfranchisement referendum

Privatisation referendum

Question I

Question II

Question III

Question IV

References

1996
1996 referendums
1996 in Poland
Pension referendums
Privatisation referendums
Privatization in Poland
February 1996 events in Europe